Gladys Walton (April 13, 1903 – November 15, 1993) was an American silent film actress.

Early life and career
Born in Boston, Massachusetts and educated in Portland, Oregon, Gladys Walton debuted in films at the Fox Sunshine comedy studio's in 1919, doing small parts in their comedy short films. As her acting talent came more out into the open, she was given larger and more important roles in films, such as La La Lucille in 1920 with Universal Studios, as well as The Secret Gift, also in 1920. She was also given her first starring role in Pink Tights (1920), opposite film star Jack Perrin. She was a contract player for Universal from 1920 to 1923, completing 28 films and earning $600 a week at the peak of her career. After leaving Universal she went on to do a few independent films. Only 5 of her 38 films exist: Pink Tights from 1920, All Dolled Up from 1921, The Untameable and Sawdust both from 1923, and A Little Girl in a Big City, released in 1925. 

Walton retired from acting in 1925.
Gladys has been said to have done theater productions, but this is untrue. There were in fact two Gladys Waltons performing in the early 1920's. One was a theater actress on the East Coast, doing traveling stage productions, while the movie star Gladys was making films on the West Coast. Writers of the time often confused the two.

Personal life
 
Walton married screenwriter Frank Liddell in 1920. She later married Henry M. Herbel in 1923, with whom she had six children. She later married Spiro (Samuel) Dilles and Kenneth James Wells. All the marriages ended in divorce.

Death
Walton died of cancer on November 15, 1993, aged 90.

Filmography

References

External links

gladyswalton.com

Gladys Walton at Virtual History

1903 births
1993 deaths
American child actresses
American film actresses
American silent film actresses
American stage actresses
Deaths from cancer in California
Actresses from Boston
20th-century American actresses